is a Stadtteil of Geisenheim, Hesse, Germany.  It lies on the edge of the Naturpark Rhein-Taunus.

Culture and sightseeing 

Marienthal Franciscan  Monastery known for its Marienwallfahrt  pilgrimage and for being the first monastery in the world to have a printing press.

References

Villages in Hesse
Rheingau-Taunus-Kreis
Rheingau